A mobile development framework is a software framework that is designed to support mobile app development. It is a software library that provides a fundamental structure to support the development of applications for a specific environment.

Frameworks can be in three categories: native frameworks for platform-specific development, mobile web app frameworks, and hybrid apps, which combine the features of both native and mobile web app frameworks.

History

With mobile device manufacturers each having its own preferred development environment, a growth mobile phone application developments that are World Wide Web capable and a large population of HTML savvy developers, there has arisen web-based application frameworks to help developers write applications that can be deployed on multiple devices.

March 6, 2008 - the first iPhone SDK beta is released to a limited number of developers (4,000).

March 12, 2008 - the first versions of the QuickConnectJavaScript, QuickConnectPHP, and QuickConnectErlang frameworks made available to the public.  These were focused on easing browser - server communication.  QuickConnectJavaScript was the basis from which the first versions of QuickConnect for the iPhone were developed.

April 8, 2008	 - iPhone OS 2.0b3 Beta 3 is released to the same set of developers. Lee Barney begins development of QuickConnect for the iPhone as a hybrid application framework.  This is the first iPhone SDK release that included the UIWebView component.  This component allows applications to display HTML and CSS pages and run JavaScript.  No database support was included at this time.  QuickConnect for the iPhone development began.  It was a port and partial re-write of the earlier QuickConnectJavaScript 1.0 framework that had been made available in March of the same year.

May 23, 2008 - Lee Barney publishes a seminal posting 'UIWebView Example Code' on the tetontech blog describing and providing source code on how to call from JavaScript to Objective-C and from Objective-C back up to JavaScript.  This posting has had over 60,000 hits.

May 29, 2008 - iPhone OS 2.0b6 Beta 6 is released.  This is the first version of the UIWebView that included SQLite database support.

July 11, 2008 - iPhone OS 2.0 and the first release version of the iPhone SDK released.  All developers could now download the SDK if they registered.

August 2008 iPhoneDevCamp in San Francisco - Nitobi begins development of PhoneGap.

November 11, 2008 - A port of QuickConnect made available for Mac desktop and laptop systems.

December 16, 2008 - version 1.0 of QuickConnect for the iPhone released.  This included support for embedded Google maps, geolocation, SQLite support both in the browser and with installed databases, an AJAX wrapper, drag-and-drop, phone, email, audio file recording and playing, as well as other features.

January 16, 2009 - version 1.0 beta 1 of QuickConnect for Android released.  This release was an eclipse project that could be imported by the user into their workspace.

August 29, 2009 - version 1.5 of QuickConnect for the iPhone released.

November 11, 2009 - version 1.6 beta 6 of the QuickConnect family made available. This included the first support for Palm WebOS.  This support was provided by an Xcode template that would build, install, and run the application into the PalmWebOS emulator. An Xcode template for Android 2.0 was also added.  This template would build for both the emulator and the Android app store as well as install and run the application on the Android emulator. Templates were now available for the iPhone, Android, and Palm webOS mobile devices.

Current frameworks

Discontinued and obsolete framework

 iUI -last stable release in 2009
 Crosswalk Project - last updated in 2017
 IPFaces mobile framework - last updated in 2013
 MoSync - discontinued, last updated in 2013
 Enyo - last updated in 2016
 NEXT - last updated in 2016
 Sencha Touch - final release in 2015
 Apache Cordova - last updated in 2021
 NSB/AppStudio - last updated in 2021

See also
Flutter (software) - open-source software development kit created by Google, used to develop applications for Android, iOS, Windows, Mac, Linux, and the web.
Online JavaScript IDE for hybrid applications
Comparison of JavaScript-based web frameworks for mobile web sites

References

Software frameworks